Canyelles is a Barcelona Metro station, named after the nearby Canyelles neighbourhood, in the Nou Barris district of the city of Barcelona. The station is served by line L3.

The station is located under Carrer de Federico García Lorca and Via Favència-Ronda de Dalt. It has an access on each side of the station on to Mercat-García Lorca and Via Favència, and Parc de Josep Maria Serra Martí.

The station was opened in 2001, when the section of line L3 was extended from Montbau station. It remained the terminus of line L3 until 2008, when the line was further extended to Trinitat Nova station.

Canyelles station was designed by Alfons Soldevila and is considerably more modern-looking than most of the city's other stations.

Gallery

References

External links

Barcelona Metro line 3 stations
Railway stations in Spain opened in 2001
Transport in Nou Barris